Revala (also Rävälä, by Henry of Livonia Revele, by Danish Census Book Revælæ) was an Ancient Estonian county. It was located in northern Estonia, by the Gulf of Finland and corresponded roughly to the present territory of Harju County. It was conquered by the Danish in 1219 during the Estonian Crusade. 
It also contained the town of Lindanise, nowadays known as Tallinn, the capital of Estonia.

The Icelandic Njal's saga—composed after 1270, but describing events between the years 960 and 1020—mentions an event that occurred somewhere in the area of what is now Tallinn and calls the place Rafala. The toponym, Rafala, was probably a derivation of Rävala, or Revala, or some other variant of the locally used Estonian-language name for the adjacent medieval Estonian county.

Parishes
 Rebala
 Ocrielæ
 Vomentakæ (Võhmataga)

See also
 Battle of Lyndanisse
 Danish Estonia
 History of Estonia
 Harria
 List of Estonian rulers
 Livonian Crusade
 St. George's Night Uprising

References

Ancient counties of Estonia
Harju County
States and territories established in the 9th century